Singing to Strangers is the sixth studio album by English singer-songwriter Jack Savoretti, released on 15 March 2019 through BMG. The lead single, "Candlelight", was released in December 2018. Savoretti embarked on a European tour in support of the album. It debuted at number one on the UK Albums Chart with 32,264 units. It is Savoretti's final album for BMG.

Background
Savoretti named the album Singing to Strangers because, he said, "That's my job: I sing to strangers. That's what I've spent most of my life doing. Singing to friends and family and fans; they're already onside, so you can, to some extent sing anything. Strangers need convincing, touching, connection."

Recording
The album was recorded in Rome at Ennio Morricone's studio in mid-2018 with producer Cam Blackwood. In addition to writing with Kylie Minogue, Savoretti co-wrote a track with Bob Dylan titled "Touchy Situation".

Track listing

Charts

Weekly charts

Year-end charts

References

2019 albums
BMG Rights Management albums
Jack Savoretti albums
Albums produced by Cam Blackwood